Philip William Rookes (23 April 1919 – February 2003) was an English footballer who played as a full back in the Football League.

Career
Born in Dulverton, Somerset, Rookes played for Bradford City, Portsmouth and Colchester United in the Football League.

Rookes joined Bradford City in October 1936 from Worksop Town. He made 11 league and 3 FA Cup appearances, before joining Portsmouth in January 1938.

He was a member of the Portsmouth First Division championship-winning teams of 1948–49 and 1949–50.

Club
Portsmouth
 Football League First Division Winner (2): 1948–49, 1949–50
 Football League War Cup Winner (1): 1941–42

Sources

References

1919 births
2003 deaths
English footballers
Association football fullbacks
Worksop Town F.C. players
Bradford City A.F.C. players
Portsmouth F.C. players
Colchester United F.C. players
Chichester City F.C. (1873) players
English Football League players
People from Dulverton